William Michael Kessler (born October 29, 1962) is an American former handball player who competed in the 1984 Summer Olympics and in the 1988 Summer Olympics.

References

1962 births
Living people
American male handball players
Olympic handball players of the United States
Handball players at the 1984 Summer Olympics
Handball players at the 1988 Summer Olympics
Pan American Games medalists in handball
Pan American Games gold medalists for the United States
Pan American Games bronze medalists for the United States
Medalists at the 1987 Pan American Games
Medalists at the 1991 Pan American Games